James Grant may refer to:

Politics and law
Sir James Grant, 1st Baronet (died 1695), Scottish lawyer
Sir James Grant, 6th Baronet (1679–1747), Scottish Whig politician
Sir James Grant, 8th Baronet (1738–1811), Scottish member of parliament
James Grant (Texas politician) (1793–1836), Texas-Mexico politician, physician and military participant in the Texas Revolution
James Grant (newspaper editor) (1802–1879), British newspaper editor
James Grant (Iowa politician) (1812–1891), U.S. political leader in Iowa
James Macpherson Grant (1822–1885), Victoria (Australia) politician
James Alexander Grant (1831–1920), Scottish-born Canadian physician and politician
James Benton Grant (1848–1911), U.S. governor of Colorado
Sir James Augustus Grant, 1st Baronet (1867–1932), British Conservative Party member of parliament
Jim Grant (lawyer) (born 1937), Canadian lawyer
James W. Grant (born 1943), U.S. congressman from Florida
J. W. Grant (born 1982), member of the Florida House of Representatives

Military
James Grant (British Army officer, born 1720) (1720–1806), British general in Revolutionary War
James Grant (navigator) (1772–1833), British naval officer, Australian explorer
James Grant (British Army officer, born 1778) (1778–1852), British major-general who fought at Waterloo
James Hope Grant (1808–1875), British general
James Grant (aviator) (1899–?), Scottish World War I flying ace
James Monteith Grant (1903–1981), Scottish officer of arms

Arts and academia
James Grant (1822–1887), Edinburgh-born author and historian
James Ardern Grant (1887–1973), English portrait painter
James Edward Grant (1905–1966), American short story writer and screenwriter
James Grant (artist) (1924–1997), California painter and sculptor
James Grant (finance) (born 1946), American author, journalist, and publisher of Grant's Interest Rate Observer
Lee Child (born 1954), pseudonym of James D. "Jim" Grant, British thriller author
James Grant (musician) (born 1964), Scottish musician
James Grant, member of the duo Ill Blu

Religion
James Grant (Scottish bishop) (1706–1778), Roman Catholic bishop in Scotland
James Grant (minister) (1800–1890),  Scottish cleric and Director of Scottish Widows
James Grant (Australian bishop) ([fl. 1960–1999), Anglican bishop and Dean of Melbourne in Australia

Sport
Jim Grant (baseball) (1894–1985), Major League Baseball pitcher
Jimmy Grant (1918–1970), Major League Baseball infielder
Jim Grant (footballer), Scottish footballer
Mudcat Grant (James Grant, 1935–2021), Major League Baseball pitcher
James Grant (rugby) (born 1964), Australian rugby football international

Other
James William Grant (astronomer) (1788–1865), Scottish astronomer, discoverer of Antares B
James Augustus Grant (1827–1892), Scottish explorer in East Africa
James Gordon Stuart Grant (1834–1902), a local eccentric in Dunedin, New Zealand.
James Shaw Grant (1910–1999), writer and journalist from the Isle of Lewis
James P. Grant (1922–1995), executive director of UNICEF